A. J. Walker (November 24, 1819 – April 25, 1872) was an American judge from Alabama was elected to the Alabama Supreme Court in 1855.

A graduate of Nashville University, Walker moved to Alabama in 1841 as a professor and taught mathematics, Latin and Greek.

In 1856, Walker requested Congressman Sampson Willis Harris secure an appointment for John Pelham to the United States Military Academy.

References
Alabama State Biography

1819 births
1872 deaths
Chief Justices of the Supreme Court of Alabama
19th-century American people
19th-century American judges
Justices of the Supreme Court of Alabama